"Gonorrhea" is a promotional single by American rapper Lil Wayne featuring Young Money signee Drake, from his eighth studio album, I Am Not a Human Being. Upon the release of I Am Not a Human Being it debuted at number 17 on the US Hot 100.

It was certified Gold by the RIAA on March 16, 2012 for selling 500,000 digital copies. It has since been certified Platinum by the RIAA.

Chart performance

Canadian Hot 100: 86

Certifications

References

2010 songs
Lil Wayne songs
Drake (musician) songs
Song recordings produced by Kane Beatz
Songs written by Lil Wayne
Songs written by Kane Beatz
Songs written by Drake (musician)